CNN Philippines News Night (alternately titled as News Night kasama si Pia Hontiveros or simply News Night) is the flagship national network news program of CNN Philippines and ALLTV, anchored by its Chief Correspondent Pia Hontiveros. The hour-long newscast, which broadcasts in the Filipino vernacular, airs at 6:00 PM on weekdays.

The show is streaming online on Facebook.

History and development
News Night was first unveiled at an intimate network meeting on March 7, 2017, as a replacement for CNN Philippines Network News and as a part of CNN PH President Armie Jarin-Bennett's continuing program restructuring. Prior to the reformat, Network News had been the sole holdover from its premiere under Solar News but had been embattled by mounting viewer criticism over retaining the name despite the network-affiliation rebranding thrice during its near 5-year run.

Network promotional material tagged News Night as a newscast that goes "above and beyond the headlines".

News Night premiered on March 27, 2017, replacing Network News at its prime 6:00 pm slot. The newscast name and format were derived from the defunct CNN news program of the same name anchored by Aaron Brown from 2001 to 2005.

by February 2019, Tuesday and Thursday 7 pm editions give way for the channel's weekly current affairs programs Politics as Usual (which airs on Tuesdays) and On The Record (which airs Thursdays). On May 18, 2020, the 7 pm edition was finally ended to give way for the return of News.PH Kasama si Pia Hontiveros as the first Filipino-language primetime newscast.

On September 2, 2022, the network announced the return of News Night in 1-hour format (6 pm to 7 pm) and will be broadcast in the Filipino language which was aired on September 5, competing with other Filipino-language newscasts such as ABS-CBN Kapamilya Channel/A2Z's TV Patrol, PTV's Ulat Bayan, TV5/One PH's Frontline Pilipinas, IBC's Tutok 13, UNTV's Ito Ang Balita, Net 25's Mata ng Agila, SMNI's Newsblast and GMA Network/GTV's 24 Oras.

On September 6, CNN Philippines partnered with Advanced Media Broadcasting System to broadcast News Night on its flagship television station ALLTV, which debuted on September 13.

Inaugural broadcast
Its first guest on its inaugural broadcast is PNP Chief Ronald dela Rosa. Dela Rosa talked to Hontiveros about the government's second attempt at its war on drugs.

Special editions
During news of urgent nature such as scheduled events, severe weather and breaking news, News Night runs two hours. However, when the direst situations warrant, News Night will serve as a lead-in to uninterrupted coverage at 8:00 pm. This was notably applied during the Battle of Marawi. Hontiveros anchored for a cumulative of four hours monitoring the unfolding situation until 10:00 pm, breaking away for SportsDesk, before Mitzi Borromeo took the anchor chair at 10:30 pm.

Anchors

Main Anchor
 Pia Hontiveros (since 2017)

Segment Anchors
 Andrei Felix (since 2022, Sports Desk; also with GTV)
 Sam Sadhwani (since 2022, Showbiz Spotlight)

Substitute Anchors
Mai Rodriguez
Ruth Cabal (CNN Philippines Anchor and Senior Correspondent)
Pinky Webb (CNN Philippines Senior Anchor and Correspondent)
Rico Hizon (CNN Philippines Senior Anchor and Director of News Content Development)
David Santos  (CNN Philippines Senior Correspondent)

Former Anchors
 Nicolette Henson-Hizon (2017, Connect; now with CLTV36)
 Mico Halili (2017, Sports Desk; now with Cignal TV)
 Paolo del Rosario (2017–2018, Sports Desk; now with One News)

Segments
 Business Report
 World Headlines
 CNN Philippines Investigates
 Regional News
 Voices
 Weather Report
 Connect
 Sports Desk
 Showbiz Spotlight (formerly Entertainment)
 #PopCulture.PH

Awards
KBP Golden Dove Awards (Kapisanan ng mga Brodkaster ng Pilipinas)
2017 - Ka Doroy Broadcaster of the Year - Pia Hontiveros

See also
 List of programs broadcast by CNN Philippines

References

2017 Philippine television series debuts
2020s Philippine television series
CNN Philippines original programming
All TV (Philippines) original programming
CNN Philippines
CNN Philippines News and Current Affairs
English-language television shows
Filipino-language television shows
Philippine television news shows
Flagship evening news shows